The Harvest Bride is a novel by Tony Richards published in 1987.

Plot summary
The Harvest Bride is a supernatural thriller.

Reception
Dave Langford reviewed The Harvest Bride for White Dwarf #99, and stated that "at once hurled aside on the grounds of excessive cuteness. I must try to be nicer."

Reviews
Review by Charles de Lint (1987) in Fantasy Review, May 1987
Review by Don D'Ammassa (1987) in Science Fiction Chronicle, #96 September 1987
Review by Phyllis McDonald (1988) in Interzone, #24 Summer 1988

References

1987 novels